Imling is a commune in the Moselle department in Grand Est in north-eastern France.
Imling is of Old Frankish Origin, with the town possibly having been founded, if not renamed. Historically the town was home to a Mennonite community, historically predominantly German in culture, but has changed to show predominantly French culture and most people speak French, both standard and dialectal.

See also
 Communes of the Moselle department

References

External links
 

Communes of Moselle (department)